Patrick John McDonald (February 28, 1887 – January 24, 1958) was a Canadian professional ice hockey player who played from 1905 until 1922, including eleven seasons in the National Hockey Association/National Hockey League for the  Montreal Canadiens, Montreal Wanderers, Quebec Bulldogs, Toronto Ontarios and Toronto St. Patricks. He was a member of the 1912 Quebec Bulldogs Stanley Cup championship team, playing eleven seasons for the Bulldogs in the period from 1905–06 until 1919–20.

Playing career
Born in Quebec City, Quebec, McDonald played intermediate hockey for the Quebec Crescents in 1905–06, moving to the Eastern Canada Amateur Hockey Association's Quebec Bulldogs for three games. Except for the 1910 season when the Quebec team did not operate due to the failure of the Canadian Hockey Association, McDonald was a member of the Bulldogs until 1912. He was a member of the 1912 Quebec Stanley Cup champion squad.

After the 1912 NHA season, McDonald played in an exhibition of NHA All-Stars out west against the PCHA All-Stars. He signed with the Vancouver Millionaires for the 1913 season, returning east to play for the new Toronto Ontarios for the 1913–14 season He returned to the Bulldogs in December 1914, and stayed with the club until 1917, when the NHA was suspended, and Quebec suspended operations.

In the new NHL, McDonald was picked up by the Montreal Wanderers. McDonald was one of 12 players who were members of the 1917–18 Wanderers' squad. The Wanderers home arena was destroyed by fire only 6 games into the 22 game schedule. This event forced the league to disperse the Wanderers players via a draft to 1 of the remaining 3 teams (Toronto, Montreal Canadiens and Ottawa Senators) in the National Hockey League. McDonald was picked up by the Montreal Canadiens for whom he played until 1919, including the ill-fated 1919 Stanley Cup Finals which was cancelled after five games (tied at 2-2, with one tied game) because of the Spanish flu pandemic. McDonald was one of the Canadiens players seriously ill with the flu when the series was called off. His teammate Joe Hall would succumb to the illness.

The following season, in 1919–20, Quebec activated its franchise, and he was 'returned' to Quebec by the Canadiens. He played in Quebec's final season in the NHA of 1919–20. The following season, the Quebec franchise was moved to Hamilton and McDonald was traded back to the Canadiens. He split the 1920–21 season with Montreal and the Toronto St. Pats, loaned there by the NHL in an attempt to make all teams competitive. McDonald's final season was in 1921–22 with the Canadiens, suiting up for only three games.

Career statistics

Regular season and playoffs

Transactions
 December 21, 1914 – Traded to Quebec (NHA) by Toronto (NHA) for Tommy Smith
 November 26, 1917 – Claimed by Montreal Wanderers (NHL) in Quebec dispersal draft.
 January 4, 1918 – Claimed by Montreal in Wanderers dispersal draft.
 November 25, 1919 – Returned to Quebec by Montreal when Quebec activated.
 November 2, 1920 – Transferred to Hamilton after Quebec relocated.
 November 27, 1920 – Traded to Montreal by Hamilton with Harry Mummery and Dave Ritchie for Goldie Prodgers, Joe Matte, Jack Coughlin and loan of Billy Coutu for 1920–21 season.
 February 11, 1921 – Loaned to Toronto by Montreal for the remainder of the 1920-21 season.

Source:

References

Notes

External links

1887 births
1958 deaths
Anglophone Quebec people
Canadian ice hockey left wingers
Ice hockey people from Quebec City
Montreal Canadiens players
Montreal Wanderers (NHL) players
Montreal Wanderers players
Quebec Bulldogs (NHA) players
Quebec Bulldogs players
Stanley Cup champions
Toronto Ontarios players
Toronto St. Pats players
Vancouver Millionaires players